The 2007 WNBA season was the 11th for the Sacramento Monarchs. The Monarchs qualified for the playoffs, but later fell to the San Antonio Silver Stars in three games.

Offseason

Dispersal Draft
Based on the Monarchs' 2006 record, they would pick 10th in the Charlotte Sting dispersal draft. The Monarchs picked LaToya Bond.

WNBA Draft

Regular season

Season standings

Season schedule

Playoffs

Player stats

References

External links
Monarchs on Basketball Reference

Sacramento Monarchs seasons
Sacramento
Sacramento Monarchs